IBM WebSphere refers to a brand of proprietary computer software products in the genre of enterprise software known as "application and integration middleware". These software products are used by end-users to create and integrate applications with other applications. IBM WebSphere has been available to the general market since 1998.

History
In June 1998, IBM introduced the first product in this brand, IBM WebSphere Performance Pack.  this first component formed a part of IBM WebSphere Application Server Network Deployment.

Products

The following products have been produced by IBM within the WebSphere brand:

 IBM WebSphere Application Server - a web application server
 IBM Workload Deployer - a hardware appliance that provides access to IBM middleware virtual images and patterns 
 IBM WebSphere eXtreme Scale - an in-memory data grid for use in high-performance computing
 IBM HTTP Server
 IBM WebSphere Adapters
 IBM Websphere Business Events
 IBM Websphere Edge Components
 IBM Websphere Host On-Demand (HOD)
 IBM WebSphere Message Broker
 Banking Transformation Toolkit
 IBM MQ
 IBM WebSphere Portlet Factory
 IBM WebSphere Process Server
 WebSphere Commerce (sold to HCL Technologies in 2019)
 WebSphere Portal (sold to HCL Technologies in 2019)

References

External links
 

 
Java enterprise platform
WebSphere
Portal software
Service-oriented architecture-related products